Paaladai is a 1967 Indian Tamil-language film, directed by A. Bhimsingh and produced by M. R. Santhanam. The film stars Sivaji Ganesan, Padmini and K. R. Vijaya. It was released on 16 June 1967.

Plot 

Sekar is a rich man belonging to a royal lineage. He is happily married to Janaki. They have been married for around ten years, but have had no children. He yearns for children and as per his friends advice, he takes his wife Janaki to a gyno and she finds that it's impossible for Janaki to get pregnant. Janaki decides to hide it from her husband as it would devastate him completely. Janaki's sister Santha comes to stay with them during her vacations. By chance, Sivaji learns that his wife is infertile. He consoles her. The next morning, Sivaji has a dream about a child and he explains it to Santha. They start growing closer. Janaki plans to get her sister married to her husband. Janaki pleads Santha to marry her husband. Santha resists initially, but gradually agrees for her sister. After the wedding, Janaki learns that she is pregnant. She sends her sister and husband to Aanaikatty for a honeymoon. In Aanaikatty, they start living together happily. They received a letter there from Janaki mentioning about her pregnancy. Both are happy for her. But Sivaji left Santha alone to see Janaki. However Santha managed to see Janaki and expressed her love. Afterwards Sivaji started to ignore Santha, so she was depressed and tried to attempt suicide. However Janaki prepared to abort her child in order to make them live happily. But both of them were saved by Sivaji. Janaki and Santha met with an accident in which Janaki gave birth to her child and died. Santha was saved and the three started their new life.

Cast 
Sivaji Ganesan as Sekar, an engineer
Padmini as Janaki
K. R. Vijaya as Shantha, Janaki's sister
V. K. Ramasamy as Sekar Ungel
V. Gopalakrishnan as Ramu
Nagesh as Vaigundam
Manorama as Sornam
T. P. Muthulakshmi as Aadhilakshmi
Senthamarai as James, Sekar's friend
Seethalakshmi as Dr. Lakshmi Rao
C. I. D. Sakunthala as Dancer

Soundtrack 
Soundtrack was composed by K. V. Mahadevan. Lyrics were by Kannadasan and Thanjai Vanan.

Reception 
Kalki said the storyline lacked newness, but appreciated the cast performances.

References

External links 
 

1960s Tamil-language films
1967 films
Films directed by A. Bhimsingh
Films scored by K. V. Mahadevan